Frank William Wade (born November 26, 1982) is an American college basketball coach who is the head basketball coach at McNeese State University in Lake Charles, Louisiana. He previously coached at Chattanooga (2013-2015), VCU (2015-2017), and LSU (2017- 2022).

Assistant coach 
Will Wade began his career as the student manager of the Clemson men's basketball team from 2002 to 2005. He worked under head coaches Larry Shyatt and Oliver Purnell, who gave him further opportunities as a graduate assistant (2005–06) and Director of Basketball Operations (2006–07). Tommy Amaker then brought him in as his first hire as Harvard men's basketball coach where he was responsible for helping to recruit a top 25 class for the program. He stayed at Harvard for the 2007–08 and 2008–09 seasons before leaving for VCU.

Will Wade was brought in as an assistant to then-head coach Shaka Smart at VCU (Wade was Smart's first hire like he had been Amaker's). He helped VCU to four consecutive postseason appearances, including a trip to the 2011 Final Four. VCU finished the 2012–13 season with a 27–9 overall mark and a No. 23 final national ranking. The VCU Rams were one of only five teams nationally to win 27 or more games in each season from 2009 to 2013 (the others being Duke, Kansas, Syracuse and Ohio State). In Wade's four years as an assistant coach, VCU was 111–37 (.750) with three straight trips to the NCAA Tournament.

Head coaching career

Chattanooga 
In 2013, Wade left his assistant coaching position at VCU to lead the Chattanooga Mocs basketball program. In his two seasons as head coach, he posted both winning overall and conference records, and gave the Mocs their first 20+ win season in 10 years. He was named the Southern Conference's 2014 Coach of the Year.

VCU 
After two seasons at Chattanooga, Wade returned to VCU to take the head coaching position vacated by Shaka Smart. In his first season returning to VCU, Wade guided the team to its first Atlantic 10 Conference regular-season championship and to a 25–11 overall record. VCU made it to the championship game of the A10 conference tournament for the fourth straight season, falling to St. Joseph's.  The Rams also made their sixth straight NCAA tournament, one of only eight teams in the country to do so. VCU made it to the round of 32 where it fell to Oklahoma 85–81.  Wade finished second in voting for A10 coach of the year.

LSU 
On March 21, 2017, Wade accepted an offer to become the head coach at Louisiana State University. On December 28, 2017, Wade earned his 100th career victory with a win over Memphis.

During the 2018–19 season, Wade's Tigers won their first five SEC games in a row. It was the first LSU team to do this since the 
2005–06 team. They also claimed two victories over top 5 opponents (Kentucky and Tennessee), the first LSU team to do so since 1980. Wade coached the 2018–19 team to the Southeastern Conference regular season championship.

On March 7, 2019, it was reported that Wade discussed a offer to a recruit, which was overheard on a Federal Bureau of Investigation wiretap. Wade described the payment as a "strong-ass offer", and in the transcripts he is quoted as saying that he was frustrated with the situation: “I’ll be honest with you, I’m fucking tired of dealing with the thing. Like I’m just fucking sick of dealing with the shit. Like, this should not be that fucking complicated.” The following day, LSU announced that he was indefinitely suspended amid the FBI's probe. Tony Benford was named interim head coach at LSU during Wade's suspension. On April 14, 2019, LSU lifted Wade's suspension.

It was also reported on April 24, 2019, that Wade agreed to significant modifications to his contract, in order to be reinstated. Some of those changes include: 1) to forfeit $250,000.00 in bonuses he would have otherwise earned during the time of his suspension, 2) the contract also now allows LSU to fire Wade for cause if he commits a Level I or Level II NCAA violation, and 3) He can also be terminated if the NCAA infractions committee issues a formal notice to LSU that Wade was involved in a Level 1 or Level 2 violation.

On August 25, 2020, reports surfaced that the investigation into the numerous, alleged, recruiting violations by Wade is ongoing, and headed to an independent panel. Two separate NCAA committees have referred LSU's case to the IARP (Independent Accountability Resolution Process, a system formed in response to a Condoleezza Rice-led commission on college basketball.) Should this panel issue a formal 'notice of allegations' to LSU as a result of this investigation, that would put an end to the 3 year, highly controversial, tenure of Wade, based on the renegotiated contract of 2019.

Wade led his 2021 Tigers to the championship game of the SEC Tournament in Nashville, and an 8-seed in the 2021 NCAA Tournament. 

He was terminated as coach on March 12, 2022 after the NCAA formally served the Notice of Allegations based on the investigations into the above reports of recruiting violations. The case is still pending adjudication with the NCAA enforcement office.

McNeese

Wade was hired to coach at McNeese on March 12, 2023, replacing John Aiken.

Head coaching record

References

1982 births
Living people
American men's basketball coaches
Basketball coaches from Tennessee
Chattanooga Mocs men's basketball coaches
Clemson Tigers men's basketball coaches
Clemson University alumni
College men's basketball head coaches in the United States
College basketball controversies in the United States
Harvard Crimson men's basketball coaches
LSU Tigers basketball coaches
McNeese Cowboys basketball coaches
Sportspeople from Nashville, Tennessee
VCU Rams men's basketball coaches